The 49th annual Berlin International Film Festival was held from 10 to 21 February 1999. The festival opened with Aimée & Jaguar by Max Färberböck. The Golden Bear was awarded to Canadian-American  film The Thin Red Line directed by Terrence Malick.

The retrospective dedicated to Austrian-American theatre and film director Otto Preminger was shown at the festival. 70 mm version of Preminger's 1959 musical film Porgy and Bess served as the closing night film.

Jury

The following people were announced as being on the jury for the festival:
 Ángela Molina, actress (Spain) - Jury President
 Ken Adam, production designer (United Kingdom)
 Paulo Branco, producer and actor (Portugal)
 Assi Dayan, actor, screenwriter, director and producer (Israel)
 Pierre-Henri Deleau, actor and producer (France)
 Katja von Garnier, director (Germany)
 Hellmuth Karasek, journalist, writer and film critic (Germany)
 Michelle Yeoh, actress (Malaysia)

Films in competition
The following films were in competition for the Golden Bear and Silver Bear awards:

Key
{| class="wikitable" width="550" colspan="1"
| style="background:#FFDEAD;" align="center"| †
|Winner of the main award for best film in its section
|-
| colspan="2"| The opening and closing films are screened during the opening and closing ceremonies respectively.
|}

Awards

The following prizes were awarded by the Jury:
 Golden Bear: The Thin Red Line by Terrence Malick
 Silver Bear – Special Jury Prize: Mifune by Søren Kragh-Jacobsen
 Silver Bear for Best Director: Stephen Frears for The Hi-Lo Country
 Silver Bear for Best Actress: Maria Schrader and Juliane Köhler for Aimée & Jaguar
 Silver Bear for Best Actor: Michael Gwisdek for Nachtgestalten
 Silver Bear for an outstanding single achievement: Marc Norman and Tom Stoppard for Shakespeare in Love
 Silver Bear for an outstanding artistic contribution: David Cronenberg for eXistenZ
 Honourable Mention:
 Iben Hjejle for Mifune
 Ça commence aujourd'hui
 John Toll for The Thin Red Line
 Alfred Bauer Prize: Karnaval by Thomas Vincent
 Blue Angel Award: Güneşe Yolculuk by Yeşim Ustaoğlu
 Honorary Golden Bear: Shirley MacLaine
 Berlinale Camera:
 Armen Medvedjev
 Meryl Streep
 Robert Rodriguez
FIPRESCI Award
Ça commence aujourd'hui by Bertrand Tavernier

References

External links
 49th Berlin International Film Festival 1999
1999 Berlin International Film Festival
Berlin International Film Festival:1999 at Internet Movie Database

49
1999 film festivals
1999 in Berlin
1999 in German cinema
1999 festivals in Europe